Soltero con hijas is a Mexican telenovela that premiered on Las Estrellas on 28 October 2019, and ended on 23 February 2020. The series is produced by Juan Osorio for Televisa, and it stars Vanessa Guzmán and Gabriel Soto.

Plot 
Nicolás (Gabriel Soto) is a single and carefree man whose life changes when he has to take care of his three orphaned nieces. He receives help from his neighbor Victoria (Vanessa Guzmán), and unexpectedly, falls in love with her. His biggest obstacle will be Victoria's father (Carlos Mata), who will try to break their relationship.

Cast 
 Vanessa Guzmán as Victoria Robles Navarro, a psychiatrist focused on children and teenagers. Her dream is to form a family but her fiancé cancels their wedding and she is diagnosed with endometriosis.
 Gabriel Soto as Nicolás Contreras, a single man who hates commitments and does not think about getting married or having children. When his sister Cristina dies, he must take care of his three nieces: Camila, Alexa, and Sofía. He works as a public relations manager at a hotel.
 Pablo Montero as Rodrigo Montero, owner of the hotel where Nicolás works at and is Victoria's ex-boyfriend. He has a son named Hugo.
 Mayrín Villanueva as Gabriela García Pérez, manager of the hotel. She is married to Juventino and has two sons, Samuel and Gustavo.
 Irina Baeva as Masha Simonova, a Russian who arrives in Acapulco looking for her father, whom she doesn't know. She is attracted to Nicolás and Rodrigo.
 Carlos Mata as Efraín Robles, Victoria's father. He is a retired captain and wants his daughter to get married and have children.
 Laura Flores as Alondra Ruvalcaba, grandmother of Camila, Alexa, and Sofía. She will fight for the custody of the girls.
 Sebastián Poza as Juan Diego "Juandi" Barrios, Ileana's son.
 Azul Guaita as Camila Paz Contreras, Nicolás' oldest niece. She is mature and responsible and it frustrates her to see that her uncle does not have the maturity, nor the responsibility necessary to take care of her and her sisters.
 Laura Vignatti as Ileana Barrios Sánchez, a single mother and Victoria's best friend. She teaches a water aerobics class at the hotel.
 René Strickler as Juventino "Juve" del Paso, Nicolás's best friend. He is married to Gabriela and is the father of Samuel and Gustavo.
 Mauricio Aspe as Mauricio Mijares, Victoria's fiancé who cancels their wedding. He is afraid of commitment and refuses to have children.
 María Sorté as Úrsula Pérez, Gabriela and Domingo's mother.
 Ana Tena as Alexa Paz Contreras, Nicolás' niece. She is always on social media and is obsessed with finding her first boyfriend.
 Charlotte Carter as Sofía Paz Contreras, Nicolás' youngest niece. The death of her parents makes her dyslexia disorder progress. She receives help from Victoria to overcome her disorder.
 Jason Romo as Hugo Montero, Rodrigo's son. His dream is to become a professional dancer but his father does not accept it.
 Santiago Zenteno as Father Domingo García Pérez, Gabriela's brother. He is a priest and also the principal of a school.
 Juan Vidal as Robertino Rodríguez Rodriguez "El Calamal", he is dedicated to money laundering and is the leader of a criminal gang.
 Bárbara Islas as Coral Palma del Mar, a receptionist at the hotel.
 Lalo Palacios as Manuel Gomiz "Manito", a bellboy at the hotel and also works as Alondra's driver.
 Mario Discua as Fabirú, the doorman and guard of the building where Nicolás lives.
 Paola Archer as Paulette
 Laureano Brizuela as Tato
 Moisés Zurman as Jaiba
 Eric Crum as Camarón
 Marcelo Bacerlo as Adrián
 Mónica Plehn as Natalia, Paulina's friend.
 Yhoana Marell as Bárbara
 Mauricio Arriaga as Samuel del Paso García, Gabriela and Juventino's son.
 Eivaut Richten as Nikolai
 Ruy Gaytán as Gustavo, del Paso García, Gabriela and Juventino's son.
 Paty Díaz as Leona Lenteja, a social worker in charge of observing Nicolás to make sure his nieces are living in good conditions. She will ally with Alondra, to take Nicolás' custody of the girls.
 Natasha Cubría as Paulina

Guest stars 
 Karla Gómez as Cristina Contreras, Nicolás' sister. She is married to Antonio and is mother of Camila, Alexa, and Sofía.
 Víctor González as Antonio Paz, Cristina's husband and father of Camila, Alexa, and Sofía.

Ratings

Episodes

Awards and nominations

References

External links 
 

2019 telenovelas
2019 Mexican television series debuts
2020 Mexican television series endings
Spanish-language telenovelas
Televisa telenovelas
Las Estrellas original programming
Comedy telenovelas